Dwight Marshall (born 3 October 1965) is an English former footballer who played as a striker.

As a schoolboy, Marshall attended Holloway Boys School in North London, and was one of the most gifted right-wingers of his day, making many appearances for Islington schools. As a professional, Marshall was an attacking left-winger or striker who featured for Plymouth Argyle, Middlesbrough and Luton Town. He also appeared for a number of non-league sides during his career. In total, Dwight made 129 league appearances for Argyle, scoring 40 goals. His time at Luton was also successful as he played in 128 league games and scored 28 goals for the Hatters.

Marshall broke his leg during the 1995–96 season, which ended with Luton being relegated from what is now the Championship. He never regained his place or his form, and he eventually left for a brief spell back at Plymouth. He then drifted into non-league football, playing at Kenilworth Road again for Kingstonian against Luton in an FA Cup tie during the 1999–2000 season.

Marshall now works as a HR business partner for a North London college.

References

External links

1965 births
Living people
English people of Jamaican descent
Jamaican emigrants to the United Kingdom
People educated at Holloway School
Jamaican footballers
English footballers
Association football forwards
Jamaican expatriate footballers
Grays Athletic F.C. players
Plymouth Argyle F.C. players
Middlesbrough F.C. players
Luton Town F.C. players
Kingstonian F.C. players
Jamaica international footballers
Premier League players
English Football League players
Slough Town F.C. players
Aylesbury United F.C. players
Boreham Wood F.C. players
Waltham Forest F.C. players
Enfield F.C. players